Live from Oklahoma... The Too Bad for Hell DVD! is the first video release by American rock band The All-American Rejects, recorded at the Brady Theater in Tulsa, Oklahoma on May 30, 2003 and released the following September 30.

Reception
The video received mixed reviews from critics. AllMusic saw the overall production as "sloppy and technically inferior affair that's as charisma-free as the band it highlight", with its "overly dark concert footage" and "murky audio completes the lackluster audiovisual package", but said that the videos for "Swing, Swing" and "The Last Song" rounded out the DVD perfectly. Punknews.org were more positive in their review, saying "This DVD proves the band is really, really tight for the majority of their 45 minute set. The vocal harmonies are dead-on, the extra bells and whistles are perfectly timed, and the band just plays really, really tightly", with the only flaw being lead guitarist Nick Wheeler's solo on the song "Your Star", calling it "horribly cringe-worthy, but it's really the only blemish of the set."

DVD Talk applauded the production of the DVD, but saw the "Lost in Stillwater" documentary extra as "OK, but not great" as it featured "some blurred images and video 'wash out'".

Concert setlist

Certifications

|-
| United States
| style="text-align:left;"|Gold
|}

References

External links
RIAA Certification

The All-American Rejects video albums
2003 video albums
Live video albums
2003 live albums